The Oxford Textbook of Clinical Research Ethics is a textbook on clinical research ethics edited by Ezekiel Emanuel, Christine Grady, Robert A. Crouch, Reidar Lie, Franklin G. Miller and David Wendler.

References 

2008 non-fiction books
Oxford University Press books
Clinical research ethics
Ethics books
Medical textbooks